Thomas Futterknecht (born 24 December 1962) is an Austrian hurdler. He competed in the men's 400 metres hurdles at the 1984 Summer Olympics.

References

1962 births
Living people
Athletes (track and field) at the 1984 Summer Olympics
Austrian male hurdlers
Olympic athletes of Austria
Place of birth missing (living people)